The Suzuki DR650 is a  single-cylinder dual-sport motorcycle made by  Suzuki since 1990 as a replacement for the  Suzuki DR600.

History and development
The first models introduced were the Djebel/Dakar and the RS that were both kick start. In 1991, the first electric start model was introduced, namely the DR650RSE. In 1992 the Djebel/Dakar model was replaced with the DR650R. This model also saw improvements in the exhaust system and a smaller fuel tank.

In 1996 the DR650SE was introduced, replacing the previous models. The engine was radically redesigned, reducing its power but allowing for more smooth delivery. The 2010+ SE model has the factory option of lowering the seat height by 40 mm for shorter riders. This involves lowering the front and rear suspension. A shorter side stand is also needed. The SE seat is narrow and firm. The SE has no tachometer but with standard gearing will cruise comfortably at 110–115 km/h. It has digital electronic CDI ignition and a coated cylinder bore to reduce weight. The exhaust pipe is made of stainless steel painted black to stop rusting.  For a single cylinder bike, it is quite smooth due to the effective balancer shaft. The 40 mm Mikuni BST40 carb gives smooth power flow. It has electric-start only. The 21-inch front tire gives good directional control on gravel roads but is still fine for fast riding on sealed roads with the standard tires. The front fork is non-adjustable while the rear mono shock is adjustable for preload (through a tricky-to-access threaded collar) and for compression damping.

 , after 27 years, the model is still in production and was the best selling over-500cc bike in New Zealand. The bike is often in the top five sellers of any capacity bikes in New Zealand. The DR650 is also a big seller in Canada and previously in Australia. The DR650 is no longer available in Australia due to the new emission regulations which came into effect on 1 November 2021.

The DR650 has been unavailable in Europe since 2001 due to stringent emission regulations which make it virtually impossible for a non-fuel-injected machine to pass.

References

External links
 Suzuki Canada DR650SE — official web page
Suzuki USA DR650SE — official web page

DR650
Dual-sport motorcycles
Motorcycles introduced in 1990